Quynh Nguyen is a Vietnamese-American classical pianist based in New York City. She has performed extensively throughout the United States, Europe, and Asia, to wide critical acclaim.  For her Carnegie Recital Hall debut, the New York Concert Review commented:  “Ms. Nguyen’s pianism and music making are graced with beauty and exuberance. She is a real artist; a wonderfully communicative performer. What a compendium of intellect, sophistication and taste!”  Dr. Quynh Nguyen currently serves on the piano faculty of Hunter College and the International Keyboard Institute and Festival in New York City.

Performances and critical acclaim
She made her New York debut in 2001, and, according to The New York Times, "received high praise from reliable quarters for her New York debut recital". American piano critic Harris Goldsmith reviewed her performance of Chopin in favorable terms, comparing her to pianists such as Ignaz Friedman, Murray Perahia, and Arthur Rubinstein. Richard Dyer of The Boston Globe, reviewing a 2003 performance, wrote, "She is often sensitive and poetic, and when she should dazzle with lively rhythm, piquant inflexions, and dashing virtuosity... she knows how to." Quynh Nguyen was selected as one of the "19 young stars of tomorrow" by Musical America in 2004.

Quynh has performed extensively throughout the United States and Europe, and Asia, in notable venues such as the Weill Recital Hall at Carnegie Hall, Avery Fisher Hall, Lincoln Center, New York; McEvoy Auditorium and the Freer Gallery at the Smithsonian in Washington D.C.; the Berlin Konzerthause in Berlin, Germany; the Grand Opera House in Hanoi, Vietnam, among many others. She has performed as a soloist with the Capella Academica in Berlin, the San Francisco Concerto Orchestra, the Bellflower Orchestra, the Brentwood-Westwood Symphony Orchestra, the Hanoi Conservatory Orchestra, and the Regional Wind Orchestra of Paris, and the Jäger Meisters Chamber Orchestra, with noted conductors such as Eduard Zilberkant, Kristiina Poska, among others. She participated and performed at various international music festivals, such as the Verbier Festival, Switzerland; the American Conservatory in Fontainebleau, France; the Mozarteum in Austria, the Bowdoin International Music Festival, Rockport Music Festival, and the International Keyboard Institute and Festival. A prizewinner in various national and international piano competitions, she has been featured on numerous radio stations throughout the United States. Her performance of the Beethoven's “Moonlight” Sonata No. 14 in C Sharp Minor was featured on Wayne Picciano's "Grand Piano" series, which was broadcast on television in multiple states across the country.  She was interviewed and featured on Japanese Television Fujisankei as well as Vietnamese national television. In February 2013, her interview and performances at the Smithsonian American Art Museum and at Hunter College were broadcast on CUNY TV channel 75, in a program titled “Study With the Best.” Her compact disc recordings are available with Arabesque Recordings.

Background
She started piano at age four with her uncle, and was nine years old when she gave her first recital. She first studied at the Hanoi Conservatory, and made her orchestral debut at age 11; she went on to receive a scholarship at Moscow's Gnessin State Musical College (where she studied with pianist Oleg Musorin), and continued her studies at the Juilliard School, Mannes College of Music, and CUNY Graduate Center.

She received her Doctor of Musical Arts degree from the Graduate Center of City University of New York in 2009. Her teachers include Bella Davidovich, Jerome Rose, Jacob Lateiner, Martin Canin and Yvonne Loriod. She has participated in master classes of such artists as Tatiana Nikolaeva, Richard Goode, Jeffrey Swann, Peter Frankle, and Andras Schiff. She received a Fulbright Scholarship during 2004–2005 to study in France for a project entitled "Messiaen and the Eastern Influence on his Music". Her dissertation titled An Analysis of Olivier Messiaen's Last Piano Solo Work: Petites esquisses d'oiseaux received the Barry Brook Dissertation award from the CUNY Graduate Center.  Additionally, she is the recipient of several awards and fellowships, including the Fulbright Fellowship and the United States Presidential Academic Excellence Award.

Teaching
Nguyen currently serves on the piano faculty of the International Keyboard Institute and Festival in New York City and at Hunter College, City University of New York, where she teaches private piano instructions and conducts piano and chamber music master classes.

Discography

2002 Quynh Nguyen, piano - Arabesque Records - (Works by Bach, Beethoven, Chopin, Ravel)

2004 (reissued in 2012) Quynh Nguyen plays Schubert Chopin - Arabesque Records (works by Schubert, Chopin)

2013 Quynh Nguyen In Recital, Live in New York - Arabesque Records - (Works by Beethoven, Messiaen, Chopin)

References

External links 
 Quynh Nguyen's Professional website 
 Audio and video samples of Nguyen's performances
 Profile on PianoTeachers.com
 International Keyboard Institute and Festival 
 Arabesque Records

Gnessin State Musical College alumni
Living people
Musicians of Vietnamese descent
People from Hanoi
Vietnamese classical pianists
Vietnamese expatriates in Russia
Vietnamese expatriates in the Soviet Union
American classical pianists
American women classical pianists
Juilliard School alumni
Mannes School of Music alumni
Graduate Center, CUNY alumni
Hunter College faculty
21st-century classical pianists
21st-century American women pianists
21st-century American pianists
Year of birth missing (living people)